Whales & Nightingales is the eighth studio album by American singer and songwriter Judy Collins, released by Elektra Records in 1970. It peaked at No. 17 on the Billboard Pop Albums chart.

The album includes material by Bob Dylan, Pete Seeger, Jacques Brel and Joan Baez, as well as Collins' top-forty version of "Amazing Grace", and the traditional "Farewell to Tarwathie", on which Collins sang to the accompaniment of humpback whales.

In 1971, the album was certified Gold by the RIAA for sales of over 500,000 copies in the US.

Track listing
Side one
 "A Song for David" (Joan Baez) – 3:25
 "Sons Of" (Eric Blau, Jacques Brel, Gérard Jouannest, Mort Shuman; arranged and adapted by Joshua Rifkin) – 2:21
 "The Patriot Game" (Dominic Behan) – 4:05
 "Prothalamium" (Michael Sahl, Aaron Kramer; arranged and adapted by Rifkin) – 1:37
 "Oh, Had I a Golden Thread" (Pete Seeger) – 3:55
 "Gene's Song" (Traditional; arranged and adapted by Gene Murrow) – 1:23
 "Farewell to Tarwathie" (Traditional; arranged and adapted by Judy Collins) – 5:13

Side two
 "Time Passes Slowly" (Bob Dylan) – 3:30
 "Marieke" (Jacques Brel, Gérard Jouannest; arranged and adapted by Rifkin) – 3:12
 "Nightingale I" (Collins) – 2:14
 "Nightingale II" (Collins, Rifkin) – 5:16
 "Simple Gifts" (Traditional; arranged and adapted by Collins) – 1:28
 "Amazing Grace" (John Newton; arranged and adapted by Collins) – 4:04

Personnel
 Judy Collins – guitar, keyboards, vocals

Additional musicians
All duties are unspecified in liner notes.

 Richard Bell
 Susan Evans
 David Grisman
 Paul Harris
 Bill Lee
 Jerry Matthews
 Gene Murrow
 John Nagy
 Paul Prestopino
 David Rea
 Joshua Rifkin
 Warren Smith
 Gene Taylor
 Greg Thomas

Technical
 Mark Abramson – producer
 John Haeny – engineer, assistant producer
 Joshua Rifkin – arranger and conductor (tracks 2, 4, 9, 11)
 John Nagy – string arrangement (track 8)
 William S. Harvey – cover concept, art direction
 Herb Goro – photography
 Greg Fulginiti – recording assistant

References

1970 albums
Judy Collins albums
Albums arranged by Joshua Rifkin
Albums produced by Mark Abramson
Elektra Records albums